Random 1–8 is the third EP by English rock band Muse. The EP was released in Japan only by Avex Trax on 4 October 2000, to promote the band's tour there. The EP consists of six B-sides recorded during the Showbiz era, and two live tracks. There are also three remixes of "Sunburn" after the last track.

Track listing

Release details

References

External links
Muse official site
Random 1-8 on MuseWiki

Muse (band) albums
2000 EPs